Hideaway is the sixth studio album by American folk rock trio America, released by Warner Bros. Records in April 1976. The album was produced by longtime Beatles producer George Martin, the fourth of seven consecutive albums he produced with America.

It was recorded at Caribou Ranch in Colorado in February 1976, with the album cover and inner sleeve photos reflecting the wintry environment. Deciding that they needed a contrast, the group recorded its next album Harbor in Hawaii.

This album was a hit in the US, peaking at number 11 on the Billboard album chart and being certified Gold by the RIAA. It produced two hit singles: "Today's the Day", which reached 23 on the Billboard singles chart and went all the way to number 1 on the adult contemporary chart for two weeks; and "Amber Cascades", which peaked at 75 on the Billboard singles chart and hit number 17 on the Adult Contemporary chart. Several other songs received airplay on FM stations playing album tracks, including "Jet Boy Blue", "Watership Down", "Don't Let It Get You Down", and "Lovely Night".

Track listing

Personnel
America
Dewey Bunnell - guitar, lead and backing vocals
Gerry Beckley - guitar, lead and backing vocals, keyboard
Dan Peek - guitar, banjo, lead and backing vocals, keyboard
with:
David Dickey – bass guitar
Willie Leacox – drums, percussion
George Martin – piano on "She's Beside You" and "Hideaway Part I"

Charts

Certifications

References

1976 albums
America (band) albums
Albums produced by George Martin
Warner Records albums